Boško Drašković (4 January 1987, Nikšić, Montenegro) is a Montenegrin boxer. At the 2012 Summer Olympics, he competed in the Men's light heavyweight, but was defeated in the first round.

Boško Drašković won a gold medal at the Mediterranean Games in Pescara (Italy) in 2009.

References

Montenegrin male boxers
Living people
Mediteran Games Peskara 2009 gold medal
Olympic boxers of Montenegro
Boxers at the 2012 Summer Olympics
Light-heavyweight boxers
1987 births
Boxers at the 2015 European Games
European Games competitors for Montenegro